Romani people have been recorded in the United Kingdom since at least the early 16th century. Records of Romani people in Scotland date to the early 16th century. This includes the sizable population of Eastern European Roma, who immigrated into the UK in the late 1990s/early 2000s, and also after EU expansion in 2004.

England 

Romanichal Travellers in England are generally known as "English Travellers" or "English Gypsies". They are found in England (as well as South Wales, Northeast Wales and the Scottish Borders), and they speak Angloromani. Much like the rest of England, there is a north–south divide between Romanichal Travellers in Southern and Northern England, with the two groups' dialects differing in pronunciation and vocabulary.

Wales 
Welsh Kale are Welsh Romani, they are found in the Welsh-speaking parts of Northwestern Wales, and they speak Welsh Kalá. The Romani population in Wales is estimated to be around 3,000. The Roma first arrived in Wales during the 16th century.

Scotland 

The first recorded reference to "the Egyptians" appears to date from 1492, during the reign of James IV, when an entry in the Book of the Lord High Treasurer records a payment "to Peter Ker of four shillings, to go to the king at Hunthall, to get letters subscribed to the 'King of Rowmais'". Two days after, a payment of twenty pounds was made at the king's command to the messenger of the 'King of Rowmais'.

According to the Scottish Traveller Education Programme, an estimated 20,000 Scottish Gypsies/Travellers live in Scotland. this includes Scottish Lowland Romani Travellers, Indigenous Scottish Lowland Travellers, Irish Travellers, Funfair Travellers (Showman) as well as Eastern European Roma.

Northern Ireland 
Around 2,500 Romanis lived in Northern Ireland in 2016. Romani people in Northern Ireland are mainly of Romanian, Hungarian, Slovakian and Czech origin.

Marginalisation 

Romani people have faced widespread marginalisation, prejudice, and discrimination across the United Kingdom.

In 2005, Doncaster Borough Council discussed its review of Gypsy and Traveller needs and concluded that "Gypsies" and Irish Travellers are among the most vulnerable and marginalised ethnic minority groups in Britain.

In 2007, a study by the Equality and Human Rights Commission found that widespread prejudice against "Gypsy Traveller" communities persists in Wales.

In 2008, a report by the University of the West of Scotland found that both Scottish and UK governments had failed to safeguard the rights of the Roma as a recognised ethnic group and did not raise awareness of Roma rights within the UK.

In 2012, an Amnesty International report stated that "Gypsy Traveller" groups in Scotland routinely suffer widespread discrimination in society, as well as a disproportionate level of scrutiny in the media.

Since 2015, changes in policy have resulted in an ongoing widespread shortage of authorised encampment sites for nomadic communities, including traditionally nomadic Romani communities. In its 2019 electoral manifesto, the Conservative Party made a promise to "tackle unauthorised Traveller camps" to "protect our communities" by empowering police to arrest Travellers and seize their homes and property without compensation, perpetuating long history of criminalisation of Travellers in the United Kingdom. After success in that election, plans to implement these policies are proceeding.

British acts of legislation

The Egyptian Act of 1530 banned Romani people from entering England, requiring those already living there to leave within sixteen days under the threat of confiscation of property, imprisonment, and deportation. The Egyptian Act of 1554 amended this law, removing the threat of punishment on the condition that Romani people abandon their "naughty, idle, and ungodly life and company" and adopt a settled, sedentary lifestyle. However, this same act also raised the penalty for noncompliance to death. Later, in 1562, new legislation was passed which permitted Romani people born in England and Wales to formally become English subjects but only if they assimilated into the local population, and the punishment of death remained for those who refused to assimilate.

The Enclosure Act of 1857 created the offence of injury or damage to village greens and interruption to its use or enjoyment as a place of exercise and recreation. The Commons Act of 1876 makes encroachment or enclosure of a village green, and interference with or occupation of the soil, unlawful unless it is with the aim of improving enjoyment of the green.

The Caravan Sites and Control of Development Act of 1960 states that no occupier of land shall cause or permit the land to be used as a caravan site unless he is the holder of a site licence. It also enables a district council to make an order prohibiting the stationing of caravans on common land, or a town or village green. These acts had the overall effect of preventing travellers using the vast majority of their traditional stopping places.

The Caravan Sites Act 1968 required local authorities to provide caravan sites for travellers if there was a demonstrated need. This was resisted by many councils, who would claim that there were no Romanichals living in their areas. The result was that insufficient pitches were provided for travellers, leading to a situation whereby holders of a pitch could no longer travel, for fear of losing it.

The crisis of the 1960s, caused by the Caravan Sites Act of 1968 (stopping new private sites being built until 1972), led to the appearance of the "British Gypsy Council" to fight for the rights of the Romani people in Britain.

In the UK, the issue of "Travellers" (referring to Romanichal Travellers, Irish Travellers, Funfair Travellers (Showmen), as well as other groups) became a 2005 general election issue, with the leader of the Conservative Party promising to review the Human Rights Act of 1998. This law, which absorbs the European Convention on Human Rights into UK primary legislation, is seen by some to permit the granting of retrospective planning permission. Severe population pressures and the paucity of greenfield sites have led to "travellers" purchasing land and setting up residential settlements very quickly, thus subverting the planning restrictions.

Romanichal Travellers and Irish Travellers argued in response that thousands of retrospective planning permissions are granted in Britain in cases involving non-Romani applicants each year and that statistics showed that 90% of planning applications by Travellers were initially refused by local councils, compared with a national average of 20% for other applicants, disproving claims of preferential treatment favouring Travellers.

They also argued that the root of the problem was that many traditional stopping places had been barricaded off and that the Criminal Justice and Public Order Act of 1994, passed by the then Conservative government, had effectively criminalised their community, for example by removing local authorities' responsibility to provide sites, thus leaving the travellers with no option but to purchase unregistered new sites themselves.

References